Navarasan is an Indian Kannada film director, actor, producer and screenwriter. He is best known for the 2019 film Damayanthi.

Early life

Navarasan was born on 26 November 1985 in Kolar Gold fields. He was born to a farmer family, and completed his schooling in Santhosh High school Bangarpet. His childhood was mostly spent in helping out his father in agriculture.

Career

Navarasan is mainly known for his works in horror and thriller movies. He was trained for action and direction at Koothupattarai Institute in Chennai.

In the year 2014, Navarasan made his debut as an actor in a tamil movie Nee en uyire directed by Vikas Lathiraj.

His work in the Kannada film industry began as both producer and actor in a horror movie Raakshasi which was released in the year 2015. Navasaran played a lead role in this film along with Sindhu Lokanath.

While he gained experience in various departments of the film industry he decided to test his direction skills with the film Vaira. The good feedback he received for Vaira gave him 
the confidence to come up with the big budget film Damayanthi. The movie was released in many languages including: Kannada, Malayalam, Tamil and Hindi as Damayanthi and Samharini in Telugu. Kannada actress Radhika Kumaraswamy acted as a lead in this film. 
Damayanthi gave Navarasan his big break in the Indian film industry as a director.

Filmography

As Actor

As Producer

As Director, Story and Screenwriter

 Vaira
 Damayanthi

References

External links
 

1985 births
People from Kolar district
Indian actors
Living people